Panizzi is an Italian surname. Notable people with the surname include:

Anthony Panizzi (1797–1879), Italian-born naturalized British librarian
Erik Panizzi (born 1994), Italian footballer
Gilles Panizzi (born 1965), French rally driver
Massimo Panizzi (born 1962), Italian Army Major General

Italian-language surnames